The initials CCSD may represent:
 Calgary Catholic School District, Alberta, Canada
 California College San Diego
 Camden City School District, New Jersey
 Central Columbia School District, Pennsylvania
 Chappaqua Central School District, New York
 Charleston County School District, South Carolina
 Cherry Creek School District, Colorado
 Clark County School District, Nevada
 Clarkstown Central School District, New York
 Coahoma County School District, Mississippi
 Cobb County School District, Georgia
 College Community School District, Iowa
 Coupled Cluster Singles and Doubles – a method in coupled cluster theory
 Centre pour la communication scientifique directe, a French research organization in charge of open access repositories for academic publishing